Endosamara is a monotypic genus of flowering plants in the legume family Fabaceae, tribe Wisterieae. Its only species is Endosamara racemosa,  a liana found from South India through Indo-China to the Philippines.

Description
Endosamara racemosa is a robust twining woody vine. The young stems are green and covered with soft hairs (pubescent); the mature stems are pale brown and hairless. The leaves are evergreen and generally have 6–12 paired leaflets plus a terminal leaflet. The inner surface is pink or pinkish purple, rarely white, with a dark greenish yellow nectar guide. Nine of the stamens are fused together, the other is free; all curve upwards at the apex. A unique feature of the genus Endosamara within the tribe Wisterieae is that the pods split into one-seeded segments before releasing the seeds.

Taxonomy

Endosamara racemosa was first described by William Roxburgh in 1832 in the genus Robinia. It was later placed in a number of other genera, including Millettia and Wisteria, before in 1984 Robert Geesink established the new genus Endosamara for the species, based principally on the unique structure of the seeds, which have flat samara-like wings but are enclosed in endocarp.

Endosamara is placed in the tribe Wisterieae, where it forms the earliest diverging clade with the genera Sarcodum and Sigmoidala. The structure of the seeds distinguishes Endosamara.

Distribution
Endosamara racemosa is found from South India to the Philippines, being native to Assam, Bangladesh, India, Laos, Malaya, Myanmar, the Philippines, Thailand and Vietnam.

References 

Wisterieae
Monotypic Fabaceae genera